A Private's Affair is a 1959 American musical comedy film directed by Raoul Walsh. It stars Sal Mineo and Christine Carère. The film was nominated for a Golden Globe in 1960.

Plot
Two men from New York—Luigi, a hip wanna-be beatnik, and Jerry, who's from Long Island—end up in Army basic training in New Jersey, as does Mike, who's a rancher from Oregon.

At a dance, Luigi falls for Marie, a neighbor of Jerry, who in turn develops a romantic interest in Luigi's friend Louise. A WAC named Katie ends up accompanying Mike to the dance. The three G.I.s can sing and end up invited to perform on a New York television program, but Jerry becomes ill and is hospitalized.

Assistant Secretary to the Army Elizabeth Chapman, meanwhile, wants to keep a 6-year-old Dutch girl from being sent back to Holland after the girl's mother dies. Elizabeth decides to marry the girl's gravely injured father so she can assume custody of the child. By mistake, an unconscious Jerry is wheeled in and ends up wed to Elizabeth, who had no idea what the girl's dad looked like.

Chaos ensues, as Jerry is repeatedly arrested or brought to see psychiatrists when he claims to have been accidentally married to one of the top officers in the U.S. Army.

Cast

 Sal Mineo as Luigi J. Maresi
 Christine Carère as Marie
 Barry Coe as Jerry Morgan
 Barbara Eden as Sgt. Katie Mulligan
 Gary Crosby as Mike Conroy
 Terry Moore as Louise Wright
 Jim Backus as Jim Gordon
 Jessie Royce Landis as Elizabeth T. Chapman
 Robert Burton as Gen. Charles E. Hargrave
 Alan Hewitt as Maj. R.C. Hanley
 Bob Denver as MacIntosh
 Tige Andrews as Sgt. Pickerell
 Ray Montgomery as Capt. Hickman
 Rudolph Anders as Dr. Leyden
 Debbie Joyce as Magdalena
 The Volantes as Themselves

Production
The film was originally known as The Love Maniac and was announced in October 1956 as a vehicle for Elvis Presley and Jayne Mansfield. It was retitled A Private Affair in 1959.

The movie was one of a number made by 20th Century Fox at the time aimed at the youth market using contract talent. Others included Holiday for Lovers and Blue Denim.

The film was meant to star Sheree North but she dropped out when she fell pregnant and was replaced by Barbara Eden, then best known for the TV series How to Marry a Millionaire. Filming began 1 April 1959.

References

External links
 
A Private's Affair at TCMDB

1959 films
1959 musical comedy films
20th Century Fox films
American musical comedy films
1950s English-language films
Films directed by Raoul Walsh
Films scored by Cyril J. Mockridge
Films set in New Jersey
Military humor in film
1950s American films